Dale (Spanish for "Hit it") is the second Spanish album and ninth studio album by American rapper Pitbull. It was released July 17, 2015, through Mr. 305 and Sony Music Latin. This album arrived almost five years after his first Spanish-language album Armando, released in 2010. The album won the Grammy Award for Best Latin Rock, Urban or Alternative Album at the 58th Annual Grammy Awards.

Background
The teaser for the release of Dale was released by Pitbull via Facebook and Twitter on May 6, 2015. On May 19, 2015 Farruko uploaded, on Facebook, a short preview of the track "Hoy Se Bebe" featured on "Dale". On June 27, Pitbull announced the official track list: the album includes collaborations with Farruko, Fuego, El Micha, Ricky Martin, Mohombi, Wisin & Yandel, Osmani Garcia, Sensato del Patio, Don Miguelo and El Chevo. In an interview for Billboard, Pitbull said: "It was about time (for 2nd Spanish album). You have records for the clubs and the streets. You have your huge records like “Baddest Girl in Town” which has sort of a Michael Jackson vibe. You have “Haciendo ruido” with Ricky Martin which has a big world feel to it. “No puedes más” with Yandel [which references “Don’t You Want Me Baby”], there's nothing in Spanish radio like that. The Yandel record has that ’80s feel to it. That’s my favorite record on the album."

Singles
 "Como Yo Le Doy" was released as the album's lead single on July 8, 2014. The track features Don Miguelo.
 "Piensas (Dile la Verdad)" was released as the album's second single November 20, 2014. The track features Gente De Zona. On July 24 there was released a Spanglish version of the song with Shaggy on Spotify.
 "Baddest Girl in Town" featuring Mohombi and Wisin, was released on June 8, 2015 as the album's third single. The song was performed by trio on Latin Award show- Premios Juventud on July 16, 2015.

Promotional singles
 "El Taxi" featuring Sensato and Osmani Garcia, was released on May 15, 2015, as the album's first promotional single. The song is a Spanish adaptation of "Murder She Wrote", by Jamaican reggae duo Chaka Demus & Pliers. A Spanglish remix with Lil' Jon and Osmani Garcia (and alternate version with Machel Montano) was also released.

Critical reception

AllMusic critic David Jeffries wrote: "It's the Pitbull album that feels most like a party with all these friends dropping in and out, and this wild night out peaks toward the end with the highlights running from the club-worthy "Baddest Girl in Town" (the first clue that this album isn't all-Spanish like Armando) to the '80s-flavored, Human League-quoting "No Puedo Más."" Jed Gottlieb of Boston Herald stated "If you really miss Pit's lyrics, I suggest you make your own. I'm sure they'll be better than 'Big news, Pitbull, Tom Cruise, Mumbai I lit up their December night like the fourth of July, Vanilla Sky.'" Brittany Spanos of Rolling Stone noted that unlike Pitbull's previous Spanish language effort Armando, Dale "skips EDM and Southern hip-hop almost entirely in favor of a fuller Latin-fusion sound." The American edition of Rolling Stone magazine placed Dale at number 2 in the list for the "10 Best Latin Albums of the Year", arguing that the singer "volleys between English and Spanish with ease, flirting with dancehall and guaguancó elements, while bringing MCs from neighboring islands along for the ride."

Commercial performance
Dale debuted at number one on the US Top Latin Albums chart, earning 5,000 album-equivalent units in its first week, according to Nielsen Music. This became Pitbull's first number one on that chart. The album also debuted at number 97 on the US Billboard 200 chart.

Track listing

Charts

Weekly charts

Year-end charts

Certifications

See also
List of number-one Billboard Latin Albums from the 2010s

References

2015 albums
Pitbull (rapper) albums
RCA Records albums
Spanish-language albums
Grammy Award for Best Latin Rock, Urban or Alternative Album